Hon. Amb. CPA Benjamin Kipkirui Langat, CBS is the immediate former Kenya's High Commissioner to Namibia. He previously served as the Member of Parliament for Ainamoi Constituency in Kericho from 2008 to 2017. He holds a Master of Business Administration Degree in Accounting and Bachelor of Commerce Degree (Accounting Option) both from the University of Nairobi. He is also a fully qualified Certified Public Accountant, and member of the Institute of Certified Public Accountants of Kenya in good standing.

He was re-elected in the 2022 general election for the United Democratic Alliance.

Early life 
Hon. Benjamin Langat was born in Chepkoiyo Village, Ainamoi in the then Kericho District.

Education 
He went to Kericho High School for his O'Levels studies and proceeded to the University of Nairobi to pursue his undergraduate degree in Commerce. He furthered his studies to a postgraduate level leading to a Master of Business Administration from the same university. Hon. Langat is also a fully Certified Public Accountant (CPA) and has his membership in good standing at the Institute of Certified Public Accountants. Langat is currently pursuing his PhD in finance at the University of Nairobi.

Professional and political career 
He served as a Senior Accountant at Chai Trading Company Limited a subsidiary of KTDA and also worked as an Internal Auditor at Consolidated Bank of Kenya Ltd before joining politics in the year 2008 as the member of parliament representing Ainamoi Constituency in the 10th and 11th Parliaments consecutively. In 2015 he was awarded the Chief of the Order of the Burning Spear (CBS) award by the president of the Republic of Kenya Uhuru Kenyatta for his distinguished service to the nation. On 9th August 2022 he was re-elected to Parliament to represent the people of Ainamoi Constituency in the 13th Parliament.

Legislation 
During his tenure in Parliament, he was actively involved as spokesman and chairman of the Departmental Committee on Finance, Planning and Trade, tasked with presenting the views of the committee on the floor of the house, including moving motions on different committee reports and bills. He was also involved in reviewing the legislation on finance, industry, tourism, trade and planning. He successfully sponsored the following bills : Finance Bill 2013, 2014, 2015, 2016, 2017, The Value Added Tax Bill (2013), The Microfinance (Amendment) Bill (2013), The Insurance (Motor Vehicle Third Party Risks) (Amendment) Bill 2013, Tax Appeals Tribunal Bill (2013) Tax Procedures Bill (2013), The Kenya Deposit Insurance (Amendment) Bill 2013 and The Securities and Investment Analysts Bill( 2014)

Ambassadorial role 
As the Head of Mission in Windhoek, he seeks to promote, protect and project Kenyan-Namibian relations within the broad areas of economic, political, social, and   environmental interests of the two countries.

References 

1976 births
Living people
Ambassadors of Kenya
Ambassadors to Namibia
People from Kericho County
University of Nairobi alumni
Members of the 10th Parliament of Kenya
Members of the 11th Parliament of Kenya
Members of the 13th Parliament of Kenya
21st-century Kenyan politicians
United Democratic Alliance (Kenya) politicians